Lunino is the name of several inhabited localities in Russia.

Urban localities
Lunino, Penza Oblast, a work settlement in Luninsky District of Penza Oblast

Rural localities
Lunino, Baltiysky District, Kaliningrad Oblast, a settlement under the administrative jurisdiction of  the town of district significance of Baltiysk in Baltiysky District of Kaliningrad Oblast
Lunino, Gvardeysky District, Kaliningrad Oblast, a settlement in Zorinsky Rural Okrug of Gvardeysky District of Kaliningrad Oblast
Lunino, Nemansky District, Kaliningrad Oblast, a settlement in Luninsky Rural Okrug of Nemansky District of Kaliningrad Oblast
Lunino, Kursk Oblast, a village in Uslansky Selsoviet of Oboyansky District of Kursk Oblast
Lunino, Nizhny Novgorod Oblast, a village in Lindovsky Selsoviet of the town of oblast significance of Bor in Nizhny Novgorod Oblast
Lunino, Novgorod Oblast, a village under the administrative jurisdiction of  the urban-type settlement of Uglovka in Okulovsky District of Novgorod Oblast
Lunino, Pskov Oblast, a village in Novorzhevsky District of Pskov Oblast
Lunino, Ryazan Oblast, a selo in Pustopolsky Rural Okrug of Shilovsky District of Ryazan Oblast
Lunino, Saratov Oblast, a selo in Turkovsky District of Saratov Oblast
Lunino, Smolensk Oblast, a village in Maleyevskoye Rural Settlement of Krasninsky District of Smolensk Oblast
Lunino, Chernsky District, Tula Oblast, a village in Bachurinskaya Rural Administration of Chernsky District of Tula Oblast
Lunino, Plavsky District, Tula Oblast, a village in Yusupovsky Rural Okrug of Plavsky District of Tula Oblast
Lunino, Vologda Oblast, a village in Velikoselsky Selsoviet of Kaduysky District of Vologda Oblast
Lunino, Yaroslavl Oblast, a village in Ponomarevsky Rural Okrug of Pereslavsky District of Yaroslavl Oblast